Kakki Khel is a town in the North-West Frontier Province of Pakistan. It is located at 32°25'10N 70°28'16E and has an altitude of 277 metres (912 feet).

References

Populated places in Tank District